Madulain railway station is a railway station in the municipality of Madulain, in the Swiss canton of Graubünden. It is located on the  Bever–Scuol-Tarasp line of the Rhaetian Railway. Hourly services operate on this line.

Services
The following services stop at Madulain:

References

External links
 
 

Railway stations in Graubünden
Rhaetian Railway stations
Madulain